The Tomb of Hayreddin Barbarossa (Turkish: Barbaros Hayreddin Paşa Türbesi) is final resting place of Ottoman admiral of the fleet Hayreddin Barbarossa whose naval victories secured Ottoman dominance over the Mediterranean during the mid 16th century.

The mausoleum was designed and built by Ottoman architect Mimar Sinan in 1541 and still retains its original features.

It is located near the ferry port of the district of Beşiktaş on the European side of Istanbul where his fleet used to assemble. There is also Istanbul Naval Museum and Barbaros Monument in the same square with tomb.

Building also marks the starting point of Barbaros Boulevard

The Ottoman Navy used to visit the mausoleum and conduct ceremonies and offerings before major expeditions. Today, similarly, Turkish Navy has this tradition also.

The tomb is open to public only in special occasions like July 1, for the Cabotage Festival, and on April 4, for the Memorial Day of Naval Martyrs.

See also
Hayreddin Barbarossa
Mimar Sinan

References

Ottoman architecture in Turkey
Mausoleums in Turkey
Mimar Sinan buildings
Buildings and structures completed in 1541
Beşiktaş
Ottoman Navy
Ottoman Navy officers